August Oliver Fager (December 25, 1891 – November 17, 1967) was an American athlete who competed mainly in long-distance races. Born in Finland, he competed for the United States in the 1924 Summer Olympics held in Paris, France on the Cross Country Team, where he won the silver medal with his teammates Earl Johnson and Arthur Studenroth. He died in Lake Worth, Florida in 1967.

References

1891 births
1967 deaths
People from Salo, Finland
Finnish emigrants to the United States (1809–1917)
American male long-distance runners
Olympic silver medalists for the United States in track and field
Athletes (track and field) at the 1924 Summer Olympics
Medalists at the 1924 Summer Olympics
Olympic cross country runners